Nordliskampen is a mountain of Akershus, in southeastern Norway.

Mountains of Viken